Lucia Chiavola Birnbaum is a Sicilian-American feminist cultural historian and professor emerita.

Life
Birnbaum was born in Kansas City, Missouri. She graduated from University of California, Berkeley with a Ph.D in 1964. She was a Clayman Institute scholar at Stanford University.
She teaches at the California Institute of Integral Studies and has also taught history at San Francisco State University.

Awards
 1987 American Book Award

Works

Liberazione della donne: feminism in Italy. Wesleyan University Press. 1986.

Editor

References

External links
"Dark Mother book website"
"Madre Oscura Primo Capitoloing, Chapter 1"
"EXCERPTS FROM OUR FIRST DISCUSSION WITH LUCIA BIRNBAUM"

California Institute of Integral Studies faculty
American feminists
American people of Italian descent
Living people
American Book Award winners
Year of birth missing (living people)